Jebi Sports Club is a North Korean football club, affiliated with the Korean People's Air Force. Jebi means swallow in Korean. They play in the DPR Korea Premier Football League.

The Jebi women's football team plays in the DPR Korea Women's League, since earning promotion from Division 2 at the end of 2014.

References

Football clubs in North Korea
Military association football clubs in North Korea